Tamarugal Province is one of  two provinces in the northern Chilean region of Tarapacá. The capital is the city of Pozo Almonte.

Name
The province is named after Pampa del Tamarugal.
Spanish name:
 Provincia de Tamarugal: Used by the government of the province.
 Provincia del Tamarugal: Used by the government of Chile. Derived from the name El Tamarugal.
 Provincia El Tamarugal: Derived from the name El Tamarugal.

Geography and demography
Between the 1992 and 2002 censuses, the population grew by 63.5% (8,748 persons).

Administration
The province is administered by a presidentially appointed delegate. Luz Eliana González Millas was appointed by president Gabriel Boric.

Communes
As a province, Tamarugal is a second-level administrative division of Chile, which is further subdivided into five communes (comunas).

References

External links
  Government of Tamarugal

Provinces of Chile
Provinces of Tarapacá Region